Green Day is an American rock band formed in 1987 in East Bay, California. The band consists of Billie Joe Armstrong (vocals, lead guitar), Mike Dirnt (bass guitar, vocals), and Tré Cool (drums, percussion). The band has released thirteen studio albums: 39/Smooth (1990), Kerplunk (1991), Dookie (1994), Insomniac (1995), Nimrod (1997), Warning (2000), American Idiot (2004), 21st Century Breakdown (2009), the ¡Uno!, ¡Dos!, ¡Tré! trilogy (2012), Revolution Radio (2016), and Father of All Motherfuckers (2020). (The first two albums were released on the Lookout! Records record label, while the remaining albums were released on Reprise Records.

Green Day has found success at the MTV Video Music Awards, receiving nine nominations for "Basket Case", the second single from Dookie; and eight awards for "Boulevard of Broken Dreams", the second single from American Idiot. The band has also received 4 Grammy Awards out of 17 nominations, or 5 out of 20 including their solo recognitions. At the American Music Awards, the trio has received six awards including "Favorite Alternate Artist" award, finally winning it in 2005. The band was nominated for nine Billboard Music Awards in 2005, winning seven of them on the night of the show, including "Rock Artist of the Year" and "Rock Song of the Year".

American Music Awards
The American Music Awards is an annual awards ceremony created by Dick Clark in 1973. Green Day has received 3 awards from eleven nominations.

ASCAP Pop Music Awards
The ASCAP Pop Music Awards is an annual awards ceremony sponsored by The American Society of Composers, Authors, and Publishers. Green Day has received two awards.

Billboard Music Awards
The Billboard Music Awards is an annual music awards show sponsored by Billboard magazine since 1990. Green Day has received six awards from nine nominations.

|-
|rowspan="9"| 2005 || American Idiot || Album of the Year || 
|-
|rowspan="6" | Green Day || Artist of the Year || 
|-
| Album Group of the Year || 
|-
| Pop Group of  the Year || 
|-
| Hot 100 Group of the Year || 
|-
| Rock Artist of the Year || 
|-
| Modern Rock Artist of the Year || 
|-
|rowspan="2" | "Boulevard of Broken Dreams" || Digital Song of the Year || 
|-
| Rock Song of the Year ||

Brit Awards
The Brit Awards are the British Phonographic Industry's annual pop music awards. Green Day has received two awards from four nominations.

|-
|  || Green Day || International Group || 
|-
|  || Green Day || International Group || 
|-
| rowspan="2" |  || Green Day || International Group || 
|-
| American Idiot || International Album ||

ECHO Awards
The ECHO is a German music award granted every year by the Deutsche Phono-Akademie (an association of recording companies). Green Day has received one award.

|-
| 2005 || Green Day || Best International Group || 
|-
| 2013 || ¡Uno! || Best International Rock/Alternative Group||

Esky Music Awards
The Esky Music Awards are awarded annually by Esquire magazine. Green Day has received one award.

|-
|2006 || Green Day || Best Band ||

GAFFA Awards

GAFFA Awards (Denmark)
Delivered since 1991, the GAFFA Awards are a Danish award that rewards popular music by the magazine of the same name.

!
|-
| 2005
| Bullet In A Bible
| Best Foreign DVD
| 
| style="text-align:center;" |
|-
|}

Grammy Awards
The Grammy Awards are awarded annually by the National Academy of Recording Arts and Sciences of the United States of America. Green Day has received 4 awards from 17 nominations, or 5 out of 20 including their solo recognitions: two nominations for Best Rock Song and one for Best Musical Show Album, Armstrong winning the last one.

|-
|rowspan="4"|  || Green Day || Best New Artist || 
|-
| "Basket Case" || Best Rock Performance by a Duo or Group with Vocal || 
|-
| "Longview" || Best Hard Rock Performance || 
|-
| Dookie || Best Alternative Music Performance || 
|-
|  || "Walking Contradiction" || Best Music Video, Short Form || 
|-
|  || "Espionage"  || Best Rock Instrumental Performance || 
|-
|rowspan="6"|  ||rowspan="2"| American Idiot || Album of the Year || 
|-
| Best Rock Album || 
|-
|rowspan="4" | "American Idiot" || Record of the Year || 
|-
| Best Rock Song || 
|-
| Best Rock Performance by a Duo or Group with Vocal || 
|-
| Best Short Form Music Video || 
|-
|  || "Boulevard of Broken Dreams" || Record of the Year || 
|-
|  || "The Saints Are Coming" (with U2) || rowspan="3" | Best Rock Performance by a Duo or Group with Vocals || 
|-
|  || "Working Class Hero" || 
|-
|rowspan="3" |  || rowspan="2" | "21 Guns" || 
|-
| Best Rock Song || 
|-
| 21st Century Breakdown || Best Rock Album || 
|-
|  || The Original Broadway Cast Recording (produced by Billie Joe Armstrong) || Best Musical Show Album || 
|-
|  || ¡Cuatro! || Best Music Film || 
|-

Japan Gold Disc Awards
The Japan Gold Disc Awards is an annual music awards ceremony established by the Recording Industry Association of Japan in 1987. Green Day has received one award.

|-
| 2005 || American Idiot || Best 10 International Rock & Pop Albums of the Year ||

Juno Awards
The Juno Awards is a Canadian awards ceremony presented annually by the Canadian Academy of Recording Arts and Sciences. Green Day has received one award.

|-
|  || American Idiot || Best International Album of the Year ||

Kerrang! Awards
The Kerrang! Awards is an annual awards ceremony held by Kerrang!, a British rock magazine. Green Day has received four awards from thirteen nominations.

|-
|rowspan="3"| 2001 ||rowspan="3"| Green Day || Classic Songwriter || 
|-
| Best International Live Act || 
|-
| Best Band in the World || 
|-
| 2004 || Green Day || Hall of Fame || 
|-
|rowspan="4"| 2005 ||rowspan="2"| Green Day || Best Band on the Planet || 
|-
| Best Live Band || 
|-
| "American Idiot" || Best Single || 
|-
| "Holiday" || Best Video || 
|-
| 2006 || "Jesus of Suburbia" || Best Video || 
|-
|rowspan="2" | 2009 || Green Day || Best International Band || 
|-
| 21st Century Breakdown || Best Album || 
|-
|rowspan="2"| 2010 ||rowspan="2"| Green Day || Best International Band || 
|-
| Best Live Band ||

Meteor Music Awards
The Meteor Music Awards are the national music awards of Ireland. They have been held every year since 2001 and are promoted by MCD Productions. Green Day has received one nomination.

|-
|2006 || "Oxegen 2005" || Best Live Performance ||

MTV

Los Premios MTV Latinoamérica
Los Premios MTV Latinoamérica is the Latin American version of the MTV Video Music Awards. Green Day has received three awards.

|-
| 2005 || Green Day || Best International Rock Group || 
|-
|rowspan="2" | 2009 || Green Day || Best International Rock Group || 
|-
| Green Day in Rock Band || Best Music in a Video Game ||

MTV Asia Awards
The MTV Asia Awards is an annual Asian awards ceremony established in 2002 by the MTV television network. Green Day has received one award from two nominations.

|-
|rowspan="2"| 2006 || Green Day || Favorite Rock Act || 
|-
| "Wake Me Up When September Ends" || Favorite Video ||

MTV Australia Awards
The MTV Australia Awards is an annual Australian awards ceremony established in 2005 by the MTV television network. Green Day has received three awards from five nominations.

|-
|rowspan="2"| 2005 || Green Day || Best Group || 
|-
| "American Idiot" || Best Rock Video || 
|-
|rowspan="3" | 2006 || rowspan="2" | "Wake Me Up When September Ends" || Video of the Year || 
|-
| Best Rock Video || 
|-
| Green Day || Best Group ||

MTV Video Music Brazil Awards
The MTV Video Music Brasil is an annual Brazilian awards ceremony established by the MTV Brasil television network.

|-
| 2005 || Boulevard of Broken Dreams || Best International Video || 
|-
| 2006 || Jesus of Suburbia || Best International Video || 
|-
| 2009 || Green Day || Best International Artist || 
|-
| 2010 || Green Day || Best International Artist ||

MTV Europe Music Awards
The MTV Europe Music Awards is an annual awards ceremony established in 1994 by MTV Europe. Green Day has received six awards from twenty nominations.

|-
|rowspan="1"| 2004 || Green Day || Best Rock || 
|-
|rowspan="3"| 2005 || American Idiot || Best Album || 
|-
| rowspan="2"| Green Day || Best Rock || 
|-
| Best Group || 
|-
| 2008 || Green Day || Best Act Ever || 
|-
|rowspan="3"| 2009 || rowspan="3" | Green Day || Best Group || 
|-
| Best Live Act || 
|-
| Best Rock || 
|-
|rowspan="1"| 2010 || Green Day || Best World Stage Performance || 
|-
|rowspan="3"| 2012 || rowspan="3" | Green Day || Best Rock || 
|-
| Best North American Act || 
|-
| Best Live Act || 
|-
|rowspan="3"| 2013 || rowspan="3" | Green Day || Best Rock || 
|-
| Best Live Act || 
|-
| Best World Stage Performance || 
|-
|rowspan="3"| 2016 || rowspan="3" | Green Day || Best Rock || 
|-
| Global Icon || 
|-
| Best Live Act || 
|-
| 2019 || Green Day|| Best Rock || 
|-
| 2020 || Green Day|| Best Rock ||

MTV Movie Awards
The MTV Movie Awards is a film awards show presented annually on the MTV television network. Green Day has received one nomination.

|-
| 1999 || "Nice Guys Finish Last" in Varsity Blues || Best Song from a Film ||

MTV Pilipinas Music Awards
The MTV Pilipinas Music Awards is an annual music awards event held in the Philippines, established in 2006 by the MTV television network. Green Day has received one award.

|-
|2006 || "Wake Me Up When September Ends" || Favorite International Video ||

MTV TRL Awards
The TRL Awards is an annual music awards ceremony established in 2006 by MTV Italy. Green Day has received one award from three nominations.

|-
|rowspan="3" | 2006 ||rowspan="3"| Green Day || Best Band That Plays Instruments || 
|-
| Countdown Killer || 
|-
| Roc Da Mic (Best Live Performance) ||

MTV Video Music Awards
The MTV Video Music Awards is an annual awards ceremony established in 1984 by MTV. Green Day has received eleven awards from 31 nominations.

|-
|rowspan="3"|  ||rowspan="3"| "Longview" || Best Group Video || 
|-
| Best New Artist in a Video || 
|-
| Best Alternative Video || 
|-
|rowspan="9"|  ||rowspan="9"| "Basket Case" || Best Group Video || 
|-
| Video of the Year || 
|-
| Best Hard Rock Video || 
|-
| Best Alternative Video || 
|-
| Breakthrough Video || 
|-
| Best Direction in a Video || 
|-
| Best Editing in a Video || 
|-
| Best Cinematography in a Video || 
|-
| Viewer's Choice Award || 
|-
|  || "Walking Contradiction" || Best Special Effects in a Video || 
|-
|rowspan="2"|  ||rowspan="2"| "Good Riddance (Time of Your Life)" || Best Alternative Video || 
|-
| Viewer's Choice Award || 
|-
|rowspan="8"|  ||rowspan="6"| "Boulevard of Broken Dreams" || Video of the Year || 
|-
| Best Group Video || 
|-
| Best Rock Video || 
|-
| Best Direction in a Video || 
|-
| Best Editing in a Video || 
|-
| Best Cinematography in a Video || 
|-
|rowspan="2"| "American Idiot" || Best Art Direction in a Video || 
|-
| Viewer's Choice Award || 
|-
|  || "Wake Me Up When September Ends" || Best Rock Video || 
|-
|  || "The Saints Are Coming" || Most Earthshattering Collaboration || 
|-
|rowspan="3"|  ||rowspan="3"| "21 Guns" || Best Rock Video || 
|-
| Best Direction || 
|-
| Best Cinematography || 
|-
|  || "21st Century Breakdown" || Best Special Effects || 
|-
|  || "Bang Bang" || Best Rock || 
|-
|  || "Oh Yeah!" || Best Rock ||

MTV Video Music Awards Japan
The MTV Video Music Awards Japan is a music awards show hosted annually by MTV Japan since 2002. Green Day has received two awards.

|-
| 2006 || "Boulevard Of Broken Dreams" || Best Rock Video || 
|-
| 2007 || "The Saints Are Coming" (Green Day & U2)|| Best Collaboration Video || 
|-
| 2010 || 21st Century Breakdown || Album of the Year || 
|-
| 2010 || "Know Your Enemy" || Best Rock Video ||

mtvU Woodie Awards
The mtvU Woodie Awards is an annual awards show sponsored by mtvU, a division of MTV Networks. Green Day has received two awards.  

|-
| 2005 || Green Day || Alumni Woodie || 
|-
| 2009 || Green Day || Performing Woodie ||

MuchMusic Video Awards
The MuchMusic Video Awards is an annual awards ceremony presented by the Canadian music video channel MuchMusic. Green Day has received two awards from eight nominations.

|-
|rowspan="3" | 2005 || "Boulevard of Broken Dreams" || Best International Group Video || 
|-
| "American Idiot" || Best International Group Video || 
|-
| Green Day || People's Choice: Favourite International Group || 
|-
|rowspan="3" | 2006 || "Wake Me Up When September Ends" || People's Choice: Favourite International Group || 
|-
| "Jesus of Suburbia" || Best International Group Video|| 
|-
| "Wake Me Up When September Ends" || Best International Group Video|| 
|-
| 2009 || "Know Your Enemy" || Best International Group Video || 
|-
| 2010 || "21 Guns" || Best International Group Video ||

MYX Music Awards
The MYX Music Awards is an annual awards ceremony presented by the Philippines music video channel MYX. Green Day has received one nomination.

|-
|2006||"Wake Me Up When September Ends" ||Favorite International Music Video||

NARM Awards
The NARM Awards are presented annually by the National Association of Recording Merchandisers. Green Day has received one award.

|-
| 2005 || Green Day || Outstanding Artist of the Year ||

Nickelodeon Kids' Choice Awards
The Nickelodeon Kids' Choice Awards is an annual awards show organized by Nickelodeon. Green Day has received three awards.

|-
|rowspan="1" | 2005 || Green Day || Favorite Music Group ||  
|-
|rowspan="2" | 2006 || Green Day || Favorite Music Group || 
|-
| "Wake Me Up When September Ends" || Favorite Song ||

NME Awards
The NME Awards is an annual music awards ceremony founded in 1953 by the music magazine NME (New Musical Express). Green Day has received four award from ten nominations.

|-
|rowspan="2" | 2005 || American Idiot || Best Album || 
|-
| "American Idiot" || Best Video || 
|-
|rowspan="3"| 2006 || Green Day || Best International Band || 
|-
| Green Day || Best Live Band || 
|-
| Bullet in a Bible || Best Music DVD || 
|-
|rowspan="4"| 2010 || Green Day || Best International Band || 
|-
|  Green Day || Worst Band|| 
|-
| 21st Century Breakdown || Worst Album || 
|-
| Billie Joe Armstrong || Hottest Man || 
|-
|rowspan="1"| 2013 || Green Day secret set at Reading Festival || Best Music Moment of the Year ||

People’s Choice Awards
The People's Choice Awards is an annual awards show created in 1975 by Bob Stivers and produced by Procter & Gamble. Green Day has received one award from four nominations.

|-
|rowspan="2" | 2006 || rowspan="2" | Green Day || Favorite Tour || 
|-
| Favorite Musical Group or Band || 
|-
| 2010 || Green Day || Favorite Rock Band || 
|-
| 2013 || Green Day || Favorite Band ||

Premios 40 Principales 

|-
| 2006
| Wake Me Up When September Ends
| Mejor Canción Internacional
|
|-
|}

Q Awards
The Q Awards are the UK's annual music awards established and run by the music magazine Q since 1990. Green Day has received one award from five nominations.

|-
|rowspan="3" | 2005 || "Boulevard of Broken Dreams" || Best Video || 
|- 
|rowspan="2" | Green Day || Best Live Act || 
|-
| Best Act in the World Today || 
|-
|rowspan="2" | 2010 
|  Green Day || Best Act in the World Today || 
|-
|rowspan ="1" | Green Day || Best Live Act || 
|-

Radio Music Awards
The Radio Music Awards is an annual awards show that honors the year's most successful songs on mainstream radio. Green Day has received five awards from eight nominations.
	

|-
|rowspan="8"| 2005 || "Holiday" || Song of the Year/Alternative and Active Rock Radio || 
|-
|rowspan="3" | Green Day || Artist of the Year/Adult Hit Radio || 
|-
| Artist of the Year/ Alternative and Active Rock Radio || 
|-
| Artist of the Year/Rock Radio || 
|-
|rowspan="4" | "Boulevard of Broken Dreams" || Song of the Year/Mainstream Hit Radio || 
|-
| Song of the Year/Alternative and Active Rock Radio || 
|-
| Song of the Year/Adult Hit Radio || 
|-
| Song of the Year/Rock Radio ||

Spike Video Game Awards
The Spike Video Game Awards is an awards show hosted by Spike TV. Green Day has received one award from two nominations.

|-
| 2004 || "American Idiot" in Madden NFL 2005 || Best Song in a Video Game || 
|-
| 2010 || "Basket Case" in Green Day: Rock Band || Best Song in a Video Game ||

TEC Awards
The Technical Excellence & Creativity Awards are distributed annually by The Mix Foundation for Excellence in Audio. Green Day has received one award.

|-
| 2005 || "American Idiot" || Outstanding Record Production/Single or Track ||

Teen Choice Awards
The Teen Choice Awards is an annual awards show established in 1999 by the Fox Broadcasting Company. Green Day has received seven nominations.

|-
|rowspan="3" | 2005 || "Boulevard of Broken Dreams" || Choice Rock Track || 
|-
|American Idiot || Music Album || 
|-
| Green Day || Music Rock Group || 
|-
|rowspan="3" | 2009 || "21st Century Breakdown" || Music Album Group || 
|-
| Green Day || Music Rock Group || 
|-
| "Know Your Enemy" || Music Rock Track || 
|-
|rowspan="3" | 2010 || Green Day: Rock Band || Best Video Game ||

TMF Awards
The TMF Awards  are an annual television awards show broadcast live on TMF (The Music Factory) in Belgium, the Netherlands, and the UK. Green Day has received one award from four nominations.

|-
| 2005 || Green Day || Best International Rock Group || 
|-
| rowspan="3"| 2009  || 21st Century Breakdown || Best International Album || 
|-
| Green Day || Best International Rock Group || 
|-
| "21 Guns" || Best International Video ||

TRL Awards
The Italian TRL Awards (from the TV Programme TRL Italy) were established in 2006 by MTV Italy to celebrate the most popular artists and music videos in Italy.

|-
| 2010 || Green Day || Best International Act ||

USA's Character Approved Awards

|-
| 2010 || Green Day || USA's Character Approved Award for Musician ||

World Music Awards
The World Music Awards is an international awards show founded in 1989 that annually honors recording artists based on worldwide sales figures provided by the International Federation of the Phonographic Industry (IFPI). Green Day has received 2 nominations.

|-
| 2005 || Green Day || World's Best Selling Rock Act || 
|-
| 2006 || Green Day || World's Best Selling Rock Artist || 
|-
|2012 || Green Day || World's Best Group || 	
|-

XM Nation Music Awards
Awarded annually by XM Satellite Radio since 2005, the XM Nation Music Awards "honor some of the most talented and interesting musicians today." Green Day has received one award from two nominations.

|-
|rowspan="2"| 2005 || rowspan="2" | Green Day || "XM Now" - Most Important Established Artist || 
|-
| Rock Artist of the Year ||

California Music Awards
The California Music Awards (formerly known as the Bammy Awards) is an annual awards ceremony established in 1978 by BAM (Bay Area Music) magazine  editor Dennis Erokan. Green Day has received seventeen awards out of seventeen nominations.

|-
| rowspan="8" | 2001 || rowspan="6" | Green Day || Artist of the Year || 
|-
| Outstanding Group || 
|-
| Outstanding Male Vocalist || 
|-
| Outstanding Bassist || 
|-
| Outstanding Drummer || 
|-
| Outstanding Songwriter || 
|-
| rowspan="2" | Warning || Outstanding Album || 
|-
| Outstanding Punk Rock/Ska Album || 
|-
| 2002 || Green Day || Outstanding Group || 
|-
| rowspan="4" | 2003 || rowspan="4" | Green Day || Artist of the Year || 
|-
| Outstanding Group || 
|-
| Outstanding Guitarist || 
|-
| "Spirit of Rock" Award || 
|-
|rowspan="4" | 2004 || "I Fought the Law" ||  Most Downloaded Song || 
|-
|rowspan="3" | Green Day ||  Outstanding Bassist || 
|-
| Outstanding Drummer || 
|-
| Outstanding Male Vocalist ||

Miscellaneous Awards

References

External links
Green Day official website

Awards
Lists of awards received by American musician
Lists of awards received by musical group